William Wintersole (July 30, 1931 – November 5, 2019) was an American actor who appeared on The Young and the Restless for over 20 years as Mitchell Sherman, as well as on General Hospital as Ted Ballantine.

A character actor, Wintersole also appeared in television series, including I Dream of Jeannie, Kojak, Little House on the Prairie, Quincy, M.E., Bonanza, Star Trek: The Original Series, Mission: Impossible; and The Fugitive.

Wintersole died from cancer at his home in Los Angeles, California at the age of 88 on November 5, 2019.

Filmography

References

External links
 

1931 births
2019 deaths
People from Portsmouth, Ohio
Male actors from Ohio
Male actors from Los Angeles
American male soap opera actors
20th-century American male actors
21st-century American male actors